Salvatgea is a genus of moths in the subfamily Lymantriinae. The genus was erected by Paul Griveaud in 1977.

Species
Some species of this genus are:
Salvatgea beondroka Griveaud, 1977
Salvatgea bipuncta (Hering, 1926)
Salvatgea lasioma (Collenette, 1959)
Salvatgea pauliani Griveaud, 1977
Salvatgea reducta Griveaud, 1977
Salvatgea tsaratanana Griveaud, 1977

References

Lymantriinae